The Australia national cricket team represents Australia in international cricket and is a full member of the International Cricket Council (ICC) with Test and One Day International (ODI) status. Australia is the joint oldest team in Test cricket history, having played in the first ever Test match in 1876

. The team also plays One Day International cricket and Twenty20 International, participating in both the first ODI, against England in the 1970–71 season and the first Twenty20 International, against New Zealand in the 2004–05 season, winning both games.

Australia is the most successful Test team in cricketing history with an overall winning rate of 47.39%. , Australia have played 844 Test matches; winning 400, lost 227, 215 were drawn and 2 matches were tied.

Australia is also the most successful ODI team in the history as well, where they have achieved an unbreakable record in ODI history. , Australia have played 975 ODI matches, winning 592 matches and losing 340; they also tied 9 matches, whilst 34 had no result. They have won the Cricket World Cup a record 5 times, more than any other nation, in 1987, 1999, 2003, 2007 and 2015, and were also runners-up in 1975 and 1996.

Though Australia is brilliant in Test and ODI arena, they have performed more indifferently in Twenty20 Internationals. , Australia have played 174 T20I matches and won 91 of them. 76 were lost, 3 tied and 4 had no result. The winning percentage is only 54.41. During 8 ICC World Twenty20 tournaments, Australia's best performance came during 2021, where they beat New Zealand to lift their first T20I World Cup. 

, Australia have faced nine of the eleven other teams in Test cricket, with their most frequent opponent being The Ashes rivals, England; playing 356 matches against them. Due to more matches against England, they have registered more wins against England, but the best winning percentage of 100 against Zimbabwe, having won all three Tests. In ODI matches, Australia have played against 18 teams; they have played against England most frequently, with a winning percentage of 57.61 in 154 matches. Against the other nations with Test status, Australia has the best record against Ireland and Afghanistan having never lost in an ODI match against them. They have also never lost an ODI match against a non-Test playing nation. The team have competed against 12 countries in T20Is, and have played 22 matches against South Africa. Out of that, Australia have defeated South Africa on 14 occasions.

Key

Test cricket

One Day International

Matches played (by country)

Twenty20 International

Matches played (by country)

Notes

References

Australia in international cricket
Cricket records and statistics
Lists of Australian cricket records and statistics